Huracán FC is a soccer team in Manati, who play in the Liga Nacional.

Liga Nacional
Drawn Aguadilla Spartans FC 3-3 in their first game.

Current squad

References

Manatí, Puerto Rico
Football clubs in Puerto Rico
Liga Nacional de Fútbol de Puerto Rico teams